St Michael's Hospital, Linlithgow was a community hospital in Linlithgow, Scotland, operated by NHS Lothian.

History
The hospital had its origins in the Linlithgow Combination Poorhouse and Infirmary which opened on the site in 1856. An infectious diseases hospital was built on an adjacent site in around 1900. The poorhouse infirmary and the infectious diseases hospital came together to form St Michael's Home and Hospital in 1932. The combined facility joined the National Health Service in 1948. The poorhouse building was demolished in 1969 and replaced with the most recent facility.

Closure

During the COVID-19 pandemic the hospital was temporarily closed, primarily due to a nursing shortage. In June 2022 it was decided by the NHS Lothian health board that the site should be permanently closed, with a final decision pending public consultation.

References

Hospitals in West Lothian
Linlithgow
NHS Scotland hospitals